Exit 13 is the twelfth studio album by American rapper LL Cool J. It was released on September 9, 2008, on the record label Def Jam Recordings. This would be his last album release with the label.

Production
This album is the first LL Cool J album since G.O.A.T. to have the parental advisory label for explicit lyrics.  LL said in an interview with Chicago radio personality DJ Z that the vulgarities are not heavy and the edited version has alternate lyrics rather than simply omitting the vulgarities. LL and DJ Kayslay teamed up to release his first mixtape as a prelude to Exit 13 titled  The Return of the G.O.A.T..

Other contributors for this album include 50 Cent, Sheek Louch, Fat Joe, Ryan Leslie, Wyclef Jean, The-Dream, Lil Mo, KRS-One, Funkmaster Flex, Richie Sambora and Darlisa Blackshere.

Singles
A buzz single titled, "Cry," featuring Lil' Mo, was released as a digital download and international 12" single on June 17, 2008. The unofficial street single, "Rockin' with the G.O.A.T.," premiered on June 20, 2008.

The first official single, "Baby" featuring The-Dream was released on July 1, 2008, to the iTunes Music Store. On August 19, 2008, iTunes released the rock remix featuring Richie Sambora, lead guitarist of rock band Bon Jovi, with a rock rhythm and a sped-up tempo.

The second official single, "Feel My Heart Beat" featuring 50 Cent was released on August 26, 2008. The song did not enter the Billboard Hot 100. The official single version of the song was leaked to the Internet on November 27, 2008.

Critical reception

Exit 13 garnered mixed reviews from music critics. At Metacritic, which assigns a normalized rating out of 100 to reviews from mainstream critics, the album received an average score of 57, based on 5 reviews.

Despite being too lengthy and containing lesser tracks like "American Girl", Jesal Padania of RapReviews praised the album for having a consistent sound of instruments and synths in the tracks and LL's strong lyricism, saying that "In other words, all that effort that LL finally put into Exit 13 has really paid off - and he is getting the best revenge of all... Showing Def Jam what they will be missing." Steve Jones of USA Today called it LL's "most aggressive album in years," praising his standard braggadocio and lady-swooning content for being consistently energetic because of an amalgam of young up-and-coming producers, concluding that "After 10 straight platinum albums, his last two have only gone gold. But he seems to have gotten his swagger back. He may be hitting the Exit, but he is not easing up on the gas." 

In The New York Times, Jon Pareles felt that LL more than holds his own with the sounds delivered by newer producers that lift his old-school meets new-school lyricism, concluding with, "To his credit, LL Cool J is too romantic to treat women as crudely as younger rappers do. And while this 76-minute album flags near the end, there’s still more than enough smooth-tongued, quick-witted rhyming to justify his boasts." AllMusic's Andy Kellman said that despite tracks like "You Better Watch Me" and "This Is Ring Tone M..." that show LL at his best, he criticized the record for being too try-hard in sounding like the mainstream rap albums released that year, concluding that "Out with a whimper, not a bang, Exit 13 is an off-ramp leading to a boulevard of several mismanaged White Castle knock-offs."

Chart performance
Exit 13 debuted and peaked at number nine on the US Bilboard 200 in the week of September 27, 2008, selling 44,000 copies in its first week of release. By October 2008, it had sold 80,000 copies in the United States, according to Nielsen SoundScan. Exit 13 would become LL Cool J's final album with Def Jam. In regards to the album's reception and lack of proper marketing, the he stated in 2009: "The record just really honestly, you know, didn’t have that support that I wish it would have had. [I] can’t blame anyone. It was my last record, and I guess for whatever reason, whether it was quality or business, you know, the company just decided that they were going to write it off and not really give it that shot."

Track listing

Sample credits
"Dear Hip Hop"
"I'm Still a Struggling Man" by Edwin Starr
"Cry"
"Half a Man" by Bunny Sigler
"I Cry" by Ja Rule feat. Lil' Mo
"It's Time for War"
"The Ultimate" by Jarrid Mendelson
"Listen to My Heart Beat"
"Take Me With You" by Lyn Christopher
"Heartbeat" by Taana Gardner
"Old School New School"
"Who Shot Ya?" by The Notorious B.I.G.
"Ur Only a Customer"
"I've Been Pushed Aside" by McFadden & Whitehead
"Mary Jane (All Night Long) (Remix)" by Mary J. Blige feat. LL Cool J
"We Rollin'"
"90% of Me Is You" by Gwen McCrae
"You Better Watch Me"
"Pee-Wee's Dance" by Joeski Love
"I'm a Hustla" by Cassidy

Charts

Weekly charts

Year-end charts

References

LL Cool J albums
2008 albums
Def Jam Recordings albums
Albums produced by Tricky Stewart
Albums produced by DJ Scratch
Albums produced by Dame Grease
Albums produced by Marley Marl
Albums produced by Ryan Leslie